Hepzibah is a  census-designated place (CDP) and coal town in Harrison County, West Virginia, United States.

Hepzibah has a post office with ZIP code 26369. As of the 2010 census, its population was 566.

References

Census-designated places in Harrison County, West Virginia
Census-designated places in West Virginia
Coal towns in West Virginia